Henderson Field is a former military airfield on Guadalcanal, Solomon Islands during World War II. Originally built by the Japanese Empire, the conflict over its possession was one of the great battles of the Pacific War. Today it is Honiara International Airport.

History

Japanese construction
After the occupation of the Solomon Islands in April 1942, the Japanese military planned to capture Port Moresby in New Guinea and Tulagi in the southern Solomons, extending their southern defensive perimeter and establishing bases to support possible future advances. Seizure of Nauru, Ocean Island, New Caledonia, Fiji, and Samoa would cut supply lines between Australia and the United States, reducing or eliminating Australia as a threat to Japanese positions in the South Pacific.

The airfield on Guadalcanal was first surveyed by Japanese engineers when they arrived in the area in early May, and was known as "Lunga Point", or "Runga Point" to the Japanese, and code named "RXI". The airfield would allow Japanese aircraft to patrol the southern Solomons, shipping lanes to Australia, and the eastern flank of New Guinea.

There were two major construction units involved: 1,379 men in one and 1,145 in another, originally designated to work on Midway Island once it was captured. They arrived on 6 July 1942, commencing work after 9 July. Construction was observed by Allied Coastwatchers, prompting American plans to capture Guadalcanal and use the airfield.

About the middle of July, 250 civilians of the "Hama Construction Unit" arrived under the command of Inouree Hama, who had had 50 men on Gavutu previously. Also, specialists from the 14th Encampment Corps established radio stations on Tulagi, Gavutu and at RXI. Local labor was also used.

Airfield construction went well, and on the night of 6 August 1942, just before the American landing, the construction troops were given an extra sake ration for completing the airfield ahead of schedule.

United States seizure and Battle of Guadalcanal
 See: Guadalcanal Campaign and Battle for Henderson Field for more information

On 7 August 1942, American forces of the 1st and 2nd Marine Divisions landed on the islands of Guadalcanal, Tulagi, and Florida in the southern Solomon Islands with the objective of preventing their use against supply and communication routes between the U.S., Australia, and New Zealand. The Allies also intended to use Guadalcanal and Tulagi to support a campaign to capture or neutralize the major Japanese base at Rabaul on New Britain.

The Marines overwhelmed the outnumbered defenders and captured Tulagi and essentially unoccupied Florida, as well as the nearly completed RXI airfield on Guadalcanal. The captured airfield was named Henderson Field in honor of United States Marine Corps Major Lofton Henderson, commanding officer of VMSB-241 who was killed in the Battle of Midway while leading his squadron against the Japanese carrier forces; he was the first Marine aviator to perish during that battle.

The first aircraft to land on the field was a PBY patrol bomber on August 12. On August 20, thirty-one Marine aircraft (F4F Wildcat fighters and SBD Dauntless dive bombers) were launched by USS Long Island from south of Guadalcanal, forming the field's first permanent air contingent. Repair and improvement was done by the US Navy Seabee 6th Naval Construction Battalion. Two days later, a squadron of U.S. Army P-400 Airacobra (P-39 variant) fighters arrived, and in the coming months a number of B-17s and U.S. Navy aircraft used the base.

Surprised by the Allied attack, the Japanese made several attempts between August and November 1942 to retake Henderson Field. Three major land battles, seven large naval battles (five nighttime surface actions and two carrier battles), occasional heavy bombardment by naval forces including Kongo-class battleships, and continual, almost daily aerial battles culminated in the decisive Naval Battle of Guadalcanal in early November 1942, during which the last Japanese attempt to bombard Henderson Field from the sea and to land enough troops to retake it was defeated.

In December 1942, the Japanese abandoned their efforts to retake Guadalcanal, conceding the island to the Allies and evacuating their last forces under harassment by the U.S. Army's XIV Corps, by 7 February 1943.

List of Naval bombardments

Between 10 September and 23 September a large force including carriers ,  and 4 Kongo class battleships depart Truk to assume station in the Solomon Islands north of Guadalcanal.

Between 11 October and 30 October Zuikaku, Shokaku, Hiei, Kirishima, Kongo and Haruna with their associated support forces depart Truk to assume station in the Solomon Islands. This operation would eventually lead to the Battle of the Santa Cruz Islands.

Operations after the Battle of Guadalcanal
In 1944, specially-fitted Liberator PB4Y-1 bombers operated from Henderson Field to carry out reconnaissance on Eniwetok and other Japanese-held islands. Royal New Zealand Air Force squadrons were using the air base during October and November 1944 for patrols and searches. The RNZAF provided No 52 Radar Unit in March 1943 with GCI radar, which (unlike the SCR 270 radar) could provide altitudes of approaching enemy planes.

Postwar use
Henderson Field was abandoned after the war. The field was modernized and reopened in 1969 as Honiara International Airport, the main airport for the Solomon Islands. In the late 1970s the runway was expanded and lengthened.

United States military use

United States Navy

 VF-5 (F4F) September 1942
 VT-8 (TBF Avenger) September - November 1942
 VC-40 (SBD, TBF)
 VMSB-131 (Avenger) 1943
 VF-26 (F4F) Mar 10 – April 25 & June 26 – Aug 5, 1943
 VF-27 (F4F) Mar 10 – April 25 & June 26 – Aug 5, 1943
 VF-28 (F4F) Mar 10 – April 25 & June 26 – Aug 5, 1943

 CAG 11 (Carrier Air Group 11)
 VF-11 (VB-11) 1943
 VB-21 (SBD) 1943
 VT-11 (TBF Avenger) 1943
 CASU-11 (Carrier Aircraft Service Unit) Feb 1943 – July 1944
 VS-54 (SBD, OS2U) June 11, 1943 – August 3, 1944

United States Marine Corps

 3d Defense Battalion (AAA) August 7, 1942 - February 19, 1943
 VMF-223 (F4F) August 20  - October 16, 1942
 VMTB-132 (SBD) Oct 30 – Dec 24, 1942
 VMTB-233 (SBD / TBF) August 1943 – October 29, 1943
 VMF-121 (F4F) October 1942
 VMF-123 (F4F) February 3  - Aug 1943
 VMF-112 "Wolf Pack" (F4U) May 1943 – July 28, 1943 – 3rd tour
 VMF-122 (F4U) June 1943 – July 23, 1943 – 1st MAW
 VMF-124 (F4U) April 4, 1943 – September 1943

 VMSB-132 (SBD) June 23, 1943 – Aug 2, 1943 – 3rd tour
 VMSB-143 (TBF) November 12, 1942 – ? Munda
 VMSB-144 (SBD-3) June 13, 1943 – June 26, 1943 then to Russells
 VMSB-236 (SBD) Espiritu Santo Nov 43 – Nov 25, 1943 to Munda
 MABS-1 (Marine Air Base Squad-1) Feb 1, 1943 – Nov 43 to Ondonga

United States Army Air Forces
 44th FS
 38th BG, 70th BS (B-26) Fiji January – Feb 4, 1943 Fiji
 42nd BG, 69th BS (B-26, B-25) New Hebrides January – Oct 43 PDG
 42nd BG, 75th BS (B-25) ? – Oct 21, 1943 Renard
 38th BG, 70th BS (B-25) Fiji ? – Oct 22, 43 Russells
 347th FG, 67th FS (P-39) New Caledonia Aug 22, 42 – June 43
 42nd BG, 390th BS (B-25) Fiji May 11 – Oct 22, 1943 Renard

See also

 Carney Airfield
 Koli Airfield
 Kukum Field

Notes

References

Bibliography

 

Airfields of the United States Army Air Forces in the Pacific Ocean theatre of World War II
Guadalcanal Campaign
Henderson
Military installations closed in the 1940s
Closed installations of the United States Navy